Jouve is a French surname. Notable people with the surname include:

André Jouve (1929–2019), French conductor and radio producer
Georges Jouve, French ceramist
Jacques Jouve (1932–2014), French politician
Jérémy Jouve (born 1979), French classical guitarist
Joseph Duval-Jouve (1810–1883), French botanist
Mireille Jouve (born 1960), French politician
Nicole Ward Jouve (born 1938), French writer and literary critic
Paul Jouve (1878–1973), French painter and sculptor
Pierre Jean Jouve (1887–1976), French author
Richard Jouve (born 1994), French cross-country skier
Roger Jouve (born 1949), French footballer
Sébastien Jouve (born 1982), French canoeist
Valérie Jouve (born 1964), French photographer and filmmaker

Surnames of French origin
French-language surnames